Lissomphalia bithynoides is a species of sea snail, a marine gastropod mollusk in the family Skeneidae.

Description
The thin, whitish shell is narrowly umbilicated. Its maximum reported size is 1 mm. The fine growth lines are crossed by microscopic close-set spiral strife, giving the surface a frosted appearance. The 3½ whorls are rapidly increasing. The body whorl is tumid. The peristome is continuous, but partly adnate.

Distribution
This species occurs in the Atlantic Ocean off Europe and in the Mediterranean Sea.

References

 BODC (2009). Species list from the British Oceanographic Data Centre.
 Gofas, S.; Le Renard, J.; Bouchet, P. (2001). Mollusca, in: Costello, M.J. et al. (Ed.) (2001). European register of marine species: a check-list of the marine species in Europe and a bibliography of guides to their identification. Collection Patrimoines Naturels, 50: pp. 180–213

External links
 

bithynoides
Gastropods described in 1880